My Face for the World to See (full title: My Face for the World to See: The Diaries, Letters, and Drawings of Candy Darling, Andy Warhol Superstar) is the published diaries of Warhol superstar Candy Darling.

The book is made up of several edited diary entries written at different times and in different journals throughout Darling's short life. It ranges from entries from Darling's childhood as a young boy, "James Slattery" in Massapequa Park, Long Island, to later entries towards the end of her life. The book also includes various letters and unprofessional sketches drawn by Darling, who was known to be interested in drawing from childhood. Most pages reflect Darling's desire for appreciation, love, respect, and her longing to belong. Also, the book's pages tell of her dreams, ambitions and wishes; including super-stardom, to be a complete woman, and to marry.

Darling's diary entries also reveal her confusion about her sexuality and gender identity (as she was a pre-operative transgender woman). Her loneliness, desperation, and ultimate frustration at society's refusal to accept her and its rejection of who she truly was are described as well. This is evident in that Candy Darling even went so far as to state that she may actually be mistaken about her female gender identity only in an attempt to banish her loneliness and receive the acceptance and love she craved. She was well aware that her situation rendered it impossible for her to find a normal partner who would love her as a woman. Darling's life is summarized in a short poem at the end of the book titled "Stardusk".

LGBT literature in the United States
Transgender non-fiction books
1990s LGBT literature
1997 books
Books published posthumously